Atilio Vásquez (born November 9, 1959) is an Argentine sprint canoer. He competed in the mid to late 1980s.

At the 1984 Summer Olympics in Los Angeles, Vásquez was eliminated in the semifinals of both the K-1 500 m and K-1 1000 m events. Four years later in Seoul, he was eliminated in the repechages of the K-1 1000 m event.

References
Sports-Reference.com profile

1959 births
Argentine male canoeists
Canoeists at the 1984 Summer Olympics
Canoeists at the 1988 Summer Olympics
Living people
Olympic canoeists of Argentina
Pan American Games bronze medalists for Argentina
Pan American Games medalists in canoeing
Canoeists at the 1987 Pan American Games
Medalists at the 1987 Pan American Games
20th-century Argentine people